60 Second Wipe Out is the third studio album by Atari Teenage Riot. It was originally released through Digital Hardcore Recordings in 1999. It peaked at number 17 on the UK Independent Albums Chart, as well as number 32 on the Billboard Heatseekers Albums chart.

Critical reception
John Bush of AllMusic gave the album 3 stars out of 5, saying, "60 Second Wipe Out has all of the ingredients fans could expect from their favorite anarcho-hardcore-electronica group." Marc Weingarten of Entertainment Weekly gave the album a grade of B+, saying: "Wielding break beats like ninja stars and synth bleets like num-chucks, [Alec] Empire performs mad chopsocky maneuvers that will turn you into a glutton for punishment."

Track listing

Personnel
Credits adapted from liner notes.

Atari Teenage Riot
 Alec Empire
 Nic Endo
 Hanin Elias
 Carl Crack

Additional musicians
 Dino Cazares – guitar (10)
 D-Stroy – vocals (11, 12, 13)
 Freestyle – vocals (12, 13)
 Kathleen Hanna – vocals (12)
 Jise – vocals (13)
 Kinetics – vocals (13)
 Q-Unique – vocals (13)

Technical personnel
 Alec Empire – mixing (10, 11, 13)
 Andy Wallace – mixing (1, 2, 3, 4, 5, 6, 7, 8, 9, 10, 11, 13)
 Dave Sardy – mixing (12)
 Steve Rooke – mastering

Charts

References

External links
 
 

1999 albums
Atari Teenage Riot albums
Elektra Records albums